Watchdog or watch dog may refer to:

Animals
Guard dog, a dog that barks to alert its owners of an intruder's presence
 Portuguese Watch Dog, Cão de Castro Laboreiro, a dog breed
 Moscow Watchdog, a breed of dog that was bred in the Soviet Union

Computing
Watchdog timer, a device that detects faults and initiates corrective actions

Public oversight
An individual or group that monitors the activities of another entity (such as an individual, corporation, non-profit group, or governmental organization) on behalf of the public to ensure that entity does not behave illegally or unethically:
Consumer watchdog, consumer protection organizations or campaigners
Charity watchdog, an organization that monitors and rates charities
Government watchdog, organizations and platforms focused on government; see :Category:Government oversight and watchdog organizations for examples
Watchdog journalism, any medium providing consumer watchdog activities
Transit watchdog, an individual or group that provides public comment regarding public transit operations

Books
 Watchdog, a novel by Laurien Berenson from her Melanie Travis Mysteries series
 Watch Dogs: Dark Clouds, a novel by John Shirley, based on the video game
 The Watchdogs, a book by Laird Wilcox about watchdog organization that monitor extremism in the US.

Comics
 Watchdogs (Marvel Comics), a right-wing terrorist group in Marvel Comics

Music
 Watch Dog, an album by Jules Shear
 "Watch Dog", a song by Etta James from the album Tell Mama
 "Watchdogs", a song by UB40 from the album Rat in the Kitchen

Film and television
Watch Dog (film), 2018 Canadian film
Watchdog (TV programme), a British television programme promoting consumer rights
 Watchdog Test House, related television show
 "Watchdogs" (Agents of S.H.I.E.L.D.), an episode of Marvel Comics' Agents of S.H.I.E.L.D.
 Watchdogs (Wander Over Yonder), a type of space alien in Wander Over Yonder
 Watch Dog, a character in Dog City
 Watchdog Man, a character in One-Punch Man

Video games

Watch Dogs, a video games series developed by Ubisoft
Watch Dogs (video game), the first game in the series

Other uses
 Watchdog.org, American news website
 Watchdog (research collective), Sri Lankan research collective

See also
 Dog watch, a work shift in a maritime watch system that is half the length of a standard watch period